Jonathan Stupar (born July 27, 1984) is a former American football tight end. He was signed by the New England Patriots as an undrafted free agent in 2008. He played college football at Virginia.

He has also been a member of the Buffalo Bills and Baltimore Ravens.

Professional career

New England Patriots
Stupar signed with the New England Patriots as an undrafted free agent in 2008.

Buffalo Bills
After being cut by the New England Patriots, he signed with the Buffalo Bills. He did not play in 2008, received limited playing time with the Bills as a backup the next two seasons.

Baltimore Ravens
Stupar signed with the Baltimore Ravens before training camp began in 2011, but he was waived on August 27.

Personal life
Stupar is the nephew of former NFL quarterback Jeff Hostetler, and the brother of current NFL linebacker Nathan Stupar. His father was also a lineman at Penn State from 1976-79.

External links
Buffalo Bills bio
New England Patriots bio
Virginia Cavaliers bio

1984 births
Living people
People from State College, Pennsylvania
Players of American football from Pennsylvania
American football tight ends
Virginia Cavaliers football players
New England Patriots players
Buffalo Bills players
Baltimore Ravens players